Cistanthe is a plant genus which includes most plants known as pussypaws. These are small, succulent flowering plants which often bear brightly colored flowers, though they vary quite a bit between species in appearance. Some species have flowers that are tightly packed into fluffy-looking inflorescences, the trait that gives them their common name. Many are adapted to arid environments, with some able to withstand climates that almost completely lack rainfall. Cistanthe was a genus created to segregate several species previously classified in Calandrinia. Several species from other closely related genera have been moved into Cistanthe as well.

Species
, Plants of the World Online accepted the following species:

Cistanthe aegialitis (F.Phil. ex Phil.) Carolin ex Hershk.
Cistanthe amarantoides (Phil.) Carolin ex Hershk.
Cistanthe ambigua (S.Watson) Carolin ex Hershk.  - desert pussypaws
Cistanthe arancioana Peralta
Cistanthe arenaria (Cham.) Carolin ex Hershk.
Cistanthe cabrerae (Añon) Peralta
Cistanthe cachinalensis (Phil.) Peralta & D.I.Ford
Cistanthe calycina (Phil.) Carolin ex Hershk.
Cistanthe celosioides (Phil.) Carolin ex Hershk.
Cistanthe cephalophora (I.M.Johnst.) Carolin ex Hershk.
Cistanthe chamissoi (Barnéoud) Carolin ex Hershk.
Cistanthe chrysantha (I.M.Johnst.) Peralta & D.I.Ford
Cistanthe coquimbensis (Barnéoud) Carolin ex Hershk.
Cistanthe crassifolia (Phil.) Carolin ex Hershk.
Cistanthe cymosa (Phil.) Hershk.
Cistanthe densiflora (Barnéoud) Hershk.
Cistanthe fenzlii (Barnéoud) Carolin ex Hershk.
Cistanthe floresiorum J.M.Watson
Cistanthe frigida (Barnéoud) Peralta
Cistanthe grandiflora (Lindl.) Schltdl.
Cistanthe guadalupensis (M.G.Dudley) Carolin ex Hershk.
Cistanthe humilis (Phil.) Peralta
Cistanthe lamprosperma (I.M.Johnst.) Peralta & D.I.Ford
Cistanthe laxiflora (Phil.) Peralta & D.I.Ford
Cistanthe lingulata (Ruiz & Pav.) Hershk.
Cistanthe longiscapa (Barnéoud) Carolin ex Hershk.
Cistanthe maritima (Nutt.) Carolin ex Hershk. - seaside pussypaws
Cistanthe minuscula (Añon) Peralta
Cistanthe mucronulata (Meyen) Carolin ex Hershk.
Cistanthe oblongifolia (Barnéoud) Carolin ex Hershk.
Cistanthe paniculata (DC.) Carolin ex Hershk.
Cistanthe philhershkovitziana Hershk.
Cistanthe picta (Gillies ex Arn.) Carolin ex Hershk.
Cistanthe salsoloides (Barnéoud) Carolin ex Hershk.
Cistanthe stricta (Phil.) Peralta
Cistanthe thyrsoidea (Reiche) Peralta & D.I.Ford
Cistanthe tovarii A.Galán
Cistanthe trigona (Colla) Hershk.
Cistanthe vicina (Phil.) Carolin ex Hershk.
Cistanthe weberbaueri (Diels) Carolin ex Hershk.

Species now placed in Calyptridium:
Cistanthe parryi - Parry's pussypaws, synonym of Calyptridium parryi
Cistanthe pulchella - Mariposa pussypaws, synonym of Calyptridium pulchellum
Cistanthe pygmaea - pygmy pussypaws, synonym of Calyptridium pygmaeum 
Cistanthe quadripetala - fourpetal pussypaws, synonym of Calyptridium quadripetalum

References

Further reading
Hershkovitz, M. A. (1991). Phylogenetic assessment and revised circumscription of Cistanthe Spach (Portulacaceae). Annals of the Missouri Botanical Garden 78(4) 1009-21

 
Caryophyllales genera